KSPO (106.5 MHz) is an FM radio station licensed to Dishman, Washington, and serving the Spokane metropolitan area.  It broadcasts a Christian talk and teaching radio format and serves as the flagship station for the American Christian Network.  It is owned by Thomas W. Read/Classical Broadcasting, with Liberty Broadcasting System holding the license.

History
KSPO was an AM station from its inception in the late 1920s until becoming an FM station in 1992. The station was originally at 96.9 before it moved to its current frequency in 1996.

Repeaters
KSPO's programming can also be heard on:
 KGDN 101.3 FM, Pasco, Washington
 KTBI AM 810, Wenatchee, Washington
 KTAC 93.9 FM, Ephrata, Washington

External links
KSPO official website

SPO
SPO
Radio stations established in 1992
1960 establishments in Washington (state)